is a Japanese-Spanish actor and singer, most known for his role as Kagurazaka Makoto in the Japanese television drama live action adaption of Hana-Kimi, Kunimitsu Tezuka in the Prince of Tennis Musicals, Tuxedo Mask in the Sailor Moon Musicals and as Kei Shinjo in Rookies. In 2009, he was named one of the most promising actors and actresses, placing 8th in a poll conducted by Oricon. He is a former member of the Watanabe Entertainment group, D-BOYS.

Early life
Shirota was born on December 26, 1985, to a Spanish mother, Pepi (née Fernandez) and a Japanese father, Shirota Mitsuo (城田光男). Shirota lived in Barcelona, Spain from when he was three to about seven years. He returned to Japan for elementary school and can still speak Spanish in ordinary conversation. He attended high school at Horikoshi High along with NEWS member Tomohisa Yamashita, WaT's Teppei Koike, Japanese actor Toma Ikuta and KAT-TUN's Jin Akanishi and Koki Tanaka.

According to Shirota, when he was little, his family liked to sing songs, so he would borrow his older sister's keyboard, while his mother taught him piano. Thus spawned Shirota's love for composing. He composed his first piece when he was in the fourth grade, titled "The Tear".

Career
Yu Shirota's acting career began from 2003 to 2004, when Shirota became the 7th actor to play Tuxedo Kamen (Tuxedo Mask) in the Sailor Moon Musicals. His first official performance as Tuxedo Kamen was on January 2, 2003, in the 2003 Winter Special Mugen Gakuen – Mistress Labyrinth (Kaiteiban). He also demonstrated his ability to play acoustic guitar on stage live, during the Starlights – Ryuusei Densetsu performances. The 2004 New Legend of Kaguya Island was Shirota's last performance as Tuxedo Kamen. That night, on September 5, 2004, after he performed his final rendition of "Prince of Earth", he announced his graduation from the role and received flowers from Kousei Amano who had previously played Tuxedo Kamen in the original 1999 Kaguya Island musical. He also began working for a year on the Japanese program, Hanamaru Cafe, as part of the Hanamaru apron team, often leaving set for locations and displaying prizes for viewers during game corners.

During this time, Shirota won the role of Kunimitsu Tezuka, the stoic captain of Seigaku Middle School's tennis club, in the Prince of Tennis musicals series, Tenimyu. From 2005 to 2006, he became the third actor to play Tezuka as a member of the second-generation Seigaku cast. He made his debut as Tezuka on January 8, 2005, in the Side Yamabuki performance in Osaka. That same year, his role as Tezuka was carried into the live adaptation film of the manga and marked his first major film appearance. He also released a Best Actor's album in 2005, for his role as Tezuka. On March 29, 2006, in the Dream Live 3rd Live concert, he along with the majority of the second generation Seigaku cast, graduated from their roles.

Through 2006, Shirota began appearing in a couple dramas and movies including the 2005 Watanabe net drama, Hice Cool, the TV drama special, The Hit Parade, portraying the real-life Mickey Curtis and the June Bride movie in which he played the title character, Natsumi, based on the original manga Jyun Bride by Satoshi Yoshida, resulted in a made for DVD release sequel, Zoku June Bride. In 2007, after nearly a year away from musicals, Shirota returned to stage and starred as Anthony Hope, the cheerful young sailor, in the Japanese stage production of Sweeney Todd. The musical opened on January 5, 2007 and ran through January 29, 2007, at the Nissay Theatre with additional performances during February in Osaka. Shirota then began appearing in a string of dramas, the first being the TV drama, Dignity of Haken, featured Shirota as the half-Spanish Ryuto Amaya, premiered on January 10, 2007, on NTV and ended its run on March 21, 2007. Shirota next appeared in his second TV drama appearance, in the April 2007 drama, Seito Shokun!, which is an adaptation of the manga series, Seito Shokun. He played Ken Mizuhara, a physical education teacher. In his third TV drama role of the year, Shirota appeared in the popular adaptation of Hanazakari No Kimitachi e, which began on July 3, 2007, playing the character of Kagurazaka Makoto, a high-jumping rival to Sano Izumi.

Shirota also appeared in a string of films in 2007. The first being Arakure KNIGHT, the live-action movie adaptation of the 1982 to 1988 manga series, Aratanaru Shobaku by Satosi Yoshida. The film opened in limited release, premiering at Cinema GAGA on April 28, 2007. The second of his three films, Shirota played a main supporting actor in the film adaptation of Gettsu Itaya's semi-autobiographical novel, Waruboro and was released on September 8, 2007, as principal filmography began on September 20, 2006. Before October 2006, Shirota finished filming for his third movie, Heat Island, which was released on October 20, 2007, and is based on the book of the same title written by Kakine Ryuosuke. Shirota played Aki, a street gangster who moves around Shibuya (a district in Tokyo) causing trouble and accidentally obtains a large sum of money that belongs to a crime group; however, the money once belonged to an illegal casino operated by the Yakuza and both groups are after the money.

After Shirota's run as Charles Lindbergh in the 2007 year-end Japanese production of the Take Flight musical, Shirota starred in the January 2008 TV drama, Koshonin – The Negotiator, portraying Mariya Kyousuke, a condemned criminal. Next, Shirota starred in Rookies, the successful baseball drama based on the manga of the same name by Morita Masanori, playing Kei Shinjo. The series first aired on April 19, 2008, and ended July 26, 2008. after 11 episodes. He would reprise his role as Kagurazaka Makoto in the 2008 Hana Kimi special episode. In 2009, Shirota starred in the made-for-television movie, Go Ape, reprised his role as Shinjo Kei in the feature film for Rookies – Sotsugyou, and co-starred with Haruma Miura in Samurai High School as the soft-spoken, Nakamura Tsuyoshi. He also reprised his role as Mariya Kyousuke for the second season of Koshonin – The Negotiator and the 2010 feature film release of Koshonin – The Movie. He is also set to be in the Japanese stage production of Elisabeth as Der Tod from August 2010 to October 2010.

He also played Ryuji Danma in the 2012 live-action version of Great Teacher Onizuka.

Shirota made his solo singing debut as "U" in May 2011 under Avex Trax, releasing his debut triple A-side single, "U/Heart of glass/Sisyphus". His first album is called UNO.

For the Japanese edition of his solo debut album, BACK TO ME, Backstreet Boys member Howie D (aka Howard Dorough) sought out Japanese idol Shirota for one of the bonus tracks, "If I Say" which was digitally released as a single on October 12, 2011.

With the D-BOYS
Shirota joined the Watanabe Entertainment group, the D-BOYS in October 2004. As a member, he participated in photobook releases, stage performances, radio show hosting, event and meeting greetings, and filming variety shows.

With the D-BoYS, he was featured in their first two photobooks, the self-titled D-Boys and the second called Start. He hosted a radio show called "Marvelous Radio Vibration" with fellow D-BOYS member Kotaro Yanagi and Yukki. The show aired on May 5, 2005, and ended its run on April 1, 2006. The D-BOYS then starred in their own drama documentary variety show called, DD-Boys in which Shirota's appeared in multiple episodes as himself. The show was 23 episodes long and ran from April 10 to September 25, 2006.

In June 2007, the D-BOYS starred in their first musical together called, D-BOYS STAGE, which ran from June 3 to 10 at the Space Zero theater in Tokyo. Shirota appeared in the musical only as a guest performer, making select appearances on June 3, June 8 and 10, due to his busy schedule. The D-BOYS then starred in their 2nd musical, The Last Game to which on June 27, 2008, Shirota announced his graduation during the encore of the play while assuring the media that he would still remain under the Watanabe Entertainment management and still participate in certain D-BOYS projects and events. He officially graduated from the group on July 6, 2008.

Despite having graduated from the D-BOYS, in December 2009, he was featured in both the sixth DVD release of the D-BOYS' Boy Friend series, called YU Channel and their "Kotoshi no Natsu wa Mainichi Dokoka de D-BOYS ☆Uki-uki♪Yatta♪Hohohoy♪" performance events, resulting in appearances in all three Natsu Doko 2009 CD and DVD releases, as well as appearances for promoting their second tour, Fuyu Doko 2009.

Personal life
In April 2006, Shirota experienced language study studying abroad for 1 week in the Australian Gold Coast. His experiences were recorded in the Language Study studying abroad 2007 journal series and covered in detail over 13 pages of his thoughts after the experience and the return home. In June 2006, he then visited New York to see five Broadway musicals: The Producers, Rent, Spelling Bee, Sweeney Todd, and The Phantom of the Opera. Shirota appears regularly in many magazines and journals. In January 2007, Wink up Magazine (Wanibooks) started a monthly column written by Shirota. This column is titled "How are you?" and usually features one picture taken by Shirota.

He, with Hirofumi Araki, also attended the opening night for the Advancement Side Rokkaku feat. Hyotei Gakuen of Tenimyu on August 3, 2006, to support Hiroki Aiba and Kousuke Kujirai.

Shirota has dated "Seventeen" model Keiko Kitagawa and actress Misako Yasuda.

In October 2011, he became an honorary fan of FC Barcelona.

Shirota has an older brother named Jun Shirota, who is also an actor and a singer. His other siblings are Maria, Rina and Dai.

Selected filmography

Film

Television

Japanese dub

Music videos

Stage
 March 22 and 23, 2007, as a guest performer in the Out of Order Live Entertainment Show

Japanese Original Musicals/Plays

SERAMYU: Sailor Moon Musical Series (as Chiba Mamoru / Tuxedo Kamen)
 Musical Bishoujo Senshi Sailor Moon Aki no Fan Kansha Event (2002)
 Winter Special Musical Bishoujo Senshi Sailor Moon Mugen Gakuen – Mistress Labyrinth (Kaiteiban) (2003)
 Musical Bishoujo Senshi Sailor Moon GW Fan Kansha Event (2003)
 Summer Special Musical Bishoujo Senshi Sailor Moon Starlights * Ryuusei Densetsu (2003)
 Musical Bishoujo Senshi Sailor Moon Aki no Fan Kansha Event (2003)
 Winter Special Musical Bishoujo Senshi Sailor Moon Kakyuu-Ouhi Kourin THE SECOND STAGE FINAL (2004)
 Summer Special Musical Bishoujo Senshi Sailor Moon Shin – Kaguya Shima Densetsu Golden Week Fan Kansha Event (2004)
 Summer Special Musical Bishoujo Senshi Sailor Moon Shin – Kaguya Shima Densetsu NEW LEGEND OF KAGUYA ISLAND (2004)

TENIMYU: The Prince of Tennis Musical Series (as Kunimitsu Tezuka)
 The Prince of Tennis Musical: Side Yamabuki feat. St Rudolph (In Winter of 2004–2005)
 The Prince of Tennis Musical: Dream Live 2nd (2005)
 The Prince of Tennis Musical: The Imperial Match Hyotei Gakuen (In Winter of 2005–2006)
 The Prince of Tennis Musical: The Imperial Match Hyotei Gakuen in Winter (2006)
 The Prince of Tennis Musical: Dream Live 3rd (2006)
 The Prince of Tennis Musical: Dream Live 7th (2010, guest appearance)

D-BOYS STAGE Series

 vol. 1 Sold-out Thanks – Nagatsuka Saburo (on June 6 and 9, 2007)
 vol. 2 The Last Game – Aimoto Shinichiro (June to July 2008)

Earth Gorgeous Produce Series

 vol. 14 The Love Bugs – Thinklemans (2016.1.9~2.24 TBS Akasaka ACT Theater, 3.1~3.3 Aichi Arts Center, 3.11~3.13 Fukuwoka Sun Palace, 3.19~3.29 Festival Hall)

European and American Musicals/Plays under Japanese Production

Sweeney Todd the Musical: The Demon Barber of Fleet Street – Anthony Hope (January 5 to 29, 2007)

Take Flight the Musical – Charles Lindbergh (2007.11.24~12.9 Tokyo International Forum Hall C, 12.14~12.16 Kita-kyushu Art Theater, 12.19~12.21 Chunichi Theater, 2008.1.3~1.5 Umeda Art Theater)

Elisabeth Das Musical – Der Tod

 Triple Cast with Yamaguchi Yuichiro, Ishimaru Kanji (2010.8.9~10.30 Imperial Theater)
 Double Cast with Inoue Yoshio (2015.6.11~8.26 Imperial Theater)
 Double Cast with Inoue Yoshio (2016.6.28~7.26 Imperial Theater, 8.6~9.4 Hakataza Theater, 9.11~9.30 Umeda Art Theater MainHall, 10.8~10.23 Chunichi Theater)

Roméo et Juliette -

 as Romeo, Double Cast with Yamazaki Ikusaburo (2011.9.7~10.2 TBS Akasaka ACT Theater, 10.8~10.20 Umeda Art Theater MainHall)
 as Romeo, with other 2 actors understudy / Tybalt (2013.9.3~10.5 Tokyu Theater Orb, 10.12~10.27 Umeda Art Theater MainHall)

Phantom the Musical – Phantom/Eric (2014.9.13~9.29 TBS Akasaka ACT Theater, 10.5~10.15 Umeda Art Theater MainHall)

Miss Julie the Straight Play – Jean (2017.3.10~4.1 Bunkamura Theater Cocoon)

Bullets over Broadway the Musical – Cheech (2018.2.7~2.28 Nissay Theater, 3.5~3.20 Umeda Art Theater MainHall, 3.24~4.1 Hakataza Theater)

Live & Concert
Live

 U 1st LIVE (2011.12.17 Umeda Art Theater Dramacity, 12.25~12.26 Tokyo Akasaka BLITZ)
 Love & Peace Tour 2012 (2012.3.2 Tokyo SHIBUYA-AX, 2012.3.4 Nagoya Diamond Hall, 2012.3.9 Osaka Morinomiya Piloti Hall)
 YU SHIROTA LIVE 2012「Segundo」 (2012.12.21~12.22 Tokyo Akasaka BLITZ, 2012.12.26 Osaka Namba Hatch）

Concert

 「Meet in Beijing Arts Festival(12th)」Shirota Yu Concert (2012.5.9 Beijing Haidian Theater）
 「4Stars One World Broadway Musicals」Concert（2013.6.15~6.23 Aoyama Theater, 6.27~6.30 Umeda Art Theater Main Hall）

*** The other three performers are Ramin Karimloo, Sierra Boggess and Lea Salonga. ***

 Yu & Musical Lovers 2013（2013.12.26~12.27 Tokyo Nihonbashi Mitsui Hall）
 Umeda Art Theater 10th Anniversary Concert「Golden Songs」(2015.2.19 Tokyo International Forum Hall C) – Guest performer　
 Iwatani Tokiko Memorial Concert (2015.10.1 Nakano Sun Plaza Hall)
 Friends of Disney Concert 2016 (2016.4.9 Tokyo International Forum Hall A)
 Iwatani Tokiko Memorial Concert－Forever－Vol.2 （2017.11.7 Nakano Sun Plaza Hall）
 4Stars 2017 Concert (2017.12.14~12.17 Umeda Art Theater Main Hall, 12.20~12.28 Tokyo International Forum Hall C）

*** The other three performers are Ramin Karimloo, Sierra Boggess and Cynthia Erivo. ***

Discography

Shirota has currently released two solo EP albums with Avex Trax, one solo album for the Prince of Tennis musical and three with the D-BOYS in Japan (JPN), only.

Official DVDs
On November 16, 2005, Shirota released an Idol DVD called With U. The DVD includes an acoustic performance for the song "Natsu no Owari ~ Mou Kako no Koi", for which he had composed and written lyrics. Despite having graduated from the D-BOYS, in December 2009, he was featured in both the sixth DVD release of the D-BOYS' Boy Friend series, called YU Channel and their "Kotoshi no Natsu wa Mainichi Dokoka de D-BOYS Ukiuki Yatta Hohhohoi" event, resulting in appearances in all three Natsu Doko CD and DVD releases.

Official photobooks
Besides appearing in the first two photobooks with the D-BOYS, on September 26, 2007, he released his first solo photobook collection. This included childhood pictures of him as well as photos taken by Shirota himself.

See also
 D-Boys
 Tenimyu
 The Prince of Tennis Movie
 The Prince of Tennis
 Kunimitsu Tezuka
 Sailor Moon musicals
 Tuxedo Kamen

References

 Wikipedia Japanese article on 城田優
 Wikipedia Japanese article on D-Boys

External links
 Shirota's official website and Profile 
 Shirota's Official Blog 
 Interview with U (Shirota U)g
 
 Yu Shirota on Avex Group 

1985 births
Living people
Japanese male actors
Japanese people of Spanish descent
U
Horikoshi High School alumni